Amblyseius muraleedharani is a species of mite in the family Phytoseiidae.

References

muraleedharani
Articles created by Qbugbot
Animals described in 1986